Csanád Erdély; (born 5 April 1996 in Dunaújváros) is a Hungarian professional ice hockey Forward who currently plays for Fehérvár AV19 in the ICE Hockey League (ICEHL).

Erdely opted to play the 2015–16 season, in North America with the Sioux Falls Stampede of the United States Hockey League. After contributing with 14 points in 55 games, he returned to his native Hungary for a second stint with Alba Volán Székesfehérvár on 21 June 2016.

References

External links

1996 births
Living people
Fehérvár AV19 players
People from Dunaújváros
Hungarian ice hockey forwards
Sioux Falls Stampede players